The Einang Sound Bridge is a road bridge in the municipality of Vestre Slidre in Innlandet county, Norway. The bridge crosses the Einang Sound and Slidre Fjord, and it is a branch of Norwegian County Road 261 connecting it to European route E16. The bridge was built in 1963.

See also
List of bridges in Norway

References

Vestre Slidre
Suspension bridges in Norway
Bridges in Innlandet
Roads in Innlandet
Bridges completed in 1963